Certain urban multiple-lane roads may have higher speed limits posted (usually 60,70 or 80 km/h).

In addition, many residential neighbourhoods have posted 30 km/h zones.

Also, certain rural highways may have higher speed limits posted (100 or 110 km/h).

History 

On 1 March 1993, the urban speed limit was lowered from 60 to 50 km/h.

On 1 May 2001, the rural speed limits were increased from 80 to 90 km/h on rural roads, from 100 to 110 km/h on expressways and from 120 to 130 km/h on motorways.

References

Hungary
Transport in Hungary